The 1961 Holy Cross Crusaders football team was an American football team that represented the College of the Holy Cross as an independent during the 1961 NCAA University Division football season. Eddie Anderson returned for the 12th consecutive year as head coach, his 18th year overall. The team compiled a record of 7–3. 

All home games were played at Fitton Field on the Holy Cross campus in Worcester, Massachusetts.

Schedule

Statistical leaders
Statistical leaders for the 1961 Crusaders included: 
 Rushing: Pat McCarthy, 512 yards and 8 touchdowns on 128 attempts
 Passing: Pat McCarthy, 1,081 yards, 76 completions and 11 touchdowns on 165 attempts
 Receiving: Al Snyder, 558 yards and 5 touchdowns on 38 receptions
 Scoring: Pat McCarthy, 54 points from 8 touchdowns and 3 two-point conversions
 Total offense: Pat McCarthy, 1,593 yards (1,081 passing, 512 rushing)
 All-purpose yards: Al Snyder, 1,112 yards (558 receiving, 370 returning, 184 rushing)

References

Holy Cross
Holy Cross Crusaders football seasons
Holy Cross Crusaders football